Green Township is one of the fourteen townships of Shelby County, Ohio, United States.  The 2000 census found  927 people in the township.

Geography
Located in the southeastern corner of the county, it borders the following townships:
Perry Township – north
Adams Township, Champaign County – northeast
Johnson Township, Champaign County – southeast
Brown Township, Miami County – south
Orange Township – west

No municipalities are located in Green Township, although the unincorporated community of Tawawa lies in the township's northeast.

Name and history
It is one of sixteen Green Townships statewide.

Government
The township is governed by a three-member board of trustees, who are elected in November of odd-numbered years to a four-year term beginning on the following January 1. Two are elected in the year after the presidential election and one is elected in the year before it. There is also an elected township fiscal officer, who serves a four-year term beginning on April 1 of the year after the election, which is held in November of the year before the presidential election. Vacancies in the fiscal officership or on the board of trustees are filled by the remaining trustees.

References

External links
County website

Townships in Shelby County, Ohio
Townships in Ohio